Miguel del Aguila was a historical painter who died in Seville in 1736. His pictures are valued for their similarity to the style of Murillo.

References
 

1736 deaths
Year of birth unknown
Painters from Seville